Michael Wycoff (January 1, 1956 – March 13, 2019) was an American R&B singer. He scored several hits on the US R&B chart during the 1980s.

Biography
Wycoff attended Wilmington Junior High School and Phineas Banning High School in Wilmington, Los Angeles, California. Wycoff played keyboards and sang in the school's talent shows.

Wycoff sang backup on Stevie Wonder's album Songs in the Key of Life. He signed a solo contract with RCA and released three albums between 1981 and 1983, scoring a few hit singles on the U.S. R&B charts. His second album, Love Conquers All, included the song, "Looking Up to You," that was sampled by the 1990s R&B group Zhané on their hit song, "Hey Mr. D.J." in 1993. Although both of his first two albums were acclaimed by music critics, sales remained low.

Wycoff succumbed to an addiction to drugs and alcohol. His addiction ultimately caused him the loss of his career, his home and his family, and Wycoff ended up homeless. At the bottom, he found his way back through his faith, beating his habit and ultimately becoming Minister of Music at several Los Angeles area churches.

His oldest son is a DJ, who, in May 2013, released his own album titled A Boy and His Toys under the name DJ Michael Wycoff.

Discography

Albums

Singles

References

External links
 Michael Wycoff at Discogs
 MySpace page

1956 births
2019 deaths
Musicians from Torrance, California
American male singers
American rhythm and blues musicians